Kevin Smith (21 September 1942 – 26 June 2003) was  a former Australian rules footballer who played with Richmond in the Victorian Football League (VFL).

Notes

External links 
		
		
		
		
		

1942 births
2003 deaths
Australian rules footballers from Victoria (Australia)
Richmond Football Club players
Myrtleford Football Club players